This is a list of years in Pakistani television.

Twenty-first century

Twentieth century

See also 
 List of years in Pakistan
 Lists of Pakistani films
 List of years in television

Television
Television in Pakistan by year
Pakistani television